Miller Library may refer to:

U. Grant Miller Library at Washington & Jefferson College
Miller Library at Colby College
Henry Miller Memorial Library
Elisabeth C. Miller Library, a unit of University of Washington Botanic Gardens
Willis L. Miller Library, a branch of South Georgia Regional Library